Raymond Lee (born February 5, 1987) is an American actor known for his roles as Arlen Lee in Mozart in the Jungle and Duc Bayer-Boatwright in Here and Now. In 2021, Lee was a series regular on the series Kevin Can F**k Himself. In March 2022, it was announced that Lee would star in the sequel/revival of the NBC science fiction drama Quantum Leap.

Life
Lee was born in New York City but moved to Los Angeles at a young age.

Although he originally studied kinesiology in college, Lee switched his major to acting at California State University, Long Beach. He co-founded the Four Clowns acting troupe. 

He is of South Korean descent.

Career
His first major role was in the web series Ktown Cowboys where he appeared opposite Lanny Joon. He has appeared in minor roles in such television series as Scandal, Modern Family and It's Always Sunny in Philadelphia.

In 2016, he starred in Qui Nguyen's Vietgone at Manhattan Theatre Club. He won a Theatre World Award for his off-Broadway debut as Quang Nguyen, a Vietnamese refugee to the United States.

Filmography

Film

Television

Theatre

Awards
2011 Top of Fringe Award, Best World Premiere Award and Best Physical Theater Award at the Hollywood Fringe Festival
2017 Theatre World Award for Vietgone

References

External links

American male actors
American male actors of Korean descent
American people of Korean descent
California State University, Long Beach alumni
1987 births
Living people
Theatre World Award winners